The 2020–21 St Johnstone F.C. season was the club's eighth season in the Scottish Premiership and their eleventh consecutive season in the top flight of Scottish football. St Johnstone also competed in the Scottish Cup and the League Cup, winning both competitions. St Johnstone became only the fourth Scottish team, and only the second outwith the Old Firm, to win a Scottish cup double.

Season summary
After the resignation of Tommy Wright, Alec Cleland took over as interim manager. After sixteen years at the club Steven Anderson left before the season began along with Danny Swanson, Ross Callachan and David McMillan. Former player and assistant manager Callum Davidson was appointed manager. Former striker Steven MacLean retired to become a coach alongside Cleland who returns to his former role. The Saints dropped to the bottom of the table after four games without a goal, but after a 5–3 away win at Hamilton they moved off it.

The Saints reached the final of the League Cup with a 3–0 win against Hibernian. On 28 February 2021, St Johnstone defeated Livingston in the final thanks to a single goal from Shaun Rooney. In doing so, the club won their first League Cup title, their second ever major honour, and ended Celtic's dominating run of having won the last 12  major honours at stake in Scotland.

On 22 May 2021, St Johnstone won the Scottish Cup, defeating Hibs by a score of 1–0 in the final, with Shaun Rooney again netting the winning goal. With the victory, St Johnstone became just the fourth club in Scottish history to win the cup double after Aberdeen, Celtic, and Rangers.

Results

Pre-season

Scottish Premiership

Scottish League Cup

Group stage

Knockout round

Scottish Cup

Squad statistics

Appearances

|-
|colspan="5"|Player who left the club during the season
|-

|}

Team statistics

League table

League Cup table

Transfers

Players in

Players out

See also
List of St Johnstone F.C. seasons

References

St Johnstone F.C. seasons
St Johnstone